The Jistebnice hymn book is a Czech  hand-written hymnbook from around 1430 and the earliest witness to a concentrated effort to translate the liturgy of the Western Church into the vernacular.

Content
The Jistebnice hymn book is the largest surviving compendium and the most important source of Hussite liturgy and singing in the Czech lands. It contains Czech translations of Latin liturgy, religious hymns, songs to be sung at vespers and also Czech folk Christmas carols.

It also contains the first record of the Hussite war song Ktož jsú boží bojovníci.

Storage
The manuscript is deposited in the Prague National Museum. A copy of the manuscript is in a gallery in Jistebnice, where the manuscript was founded.

See also
List of English-language hymnals by denomination

References

Literature

Czech music
1430s books
Hussite history
Protestant hymnals
Czech manuscripts
15th-century manuscripts
Collections of the National Museum in Prague